The Bazhong–Dazhou railway is a railway line in Sichuan, China.

History 
Construction on the line began on 27 September 2009. It opened on 10 January 2016.

Specification 
At Bazhong railway station the line continues as the Guangyuan–Bazhong railway. The line joins the Xiangyang–Chongqing railway north of Dushi railway station.

References 

Railway lines in China
Railway lines opened in 2016